The Mingachevir Dam (Mingachevir Hydro Power Station) is an earth-fill embankment dam on the Kura River just north of Mingachevir in Azerbaijan. It serves several purposes to include hydroelectric power production and water storage for irrigation. Its six Francis turbine-generators were overhauled or replaced with  sets in 2000. It is the largest hydroelectric power station in the South Caucasus, is located over Kur river and not far from Mingachevir city.

History 
The construction of the station started in 1945, the first hydro aggregate was put into operation in 1953. The main turbines were originally from Fengman Hydropower Station in Northeast China, acquired by the Red Army during the invasion of Manchuria in 1945. In 1954, the station was put into operation with full capacity. President Aliyev participated in the ceremony of commissioning of Mingachevir hydroelectric power station after reconstruction on February 27, 2018. All hydro generators and hydro turbines of the station were replaced with new ones within the framework of the reconstruction. As a result, the production capacity of the power station was increased from 284 MW to 424 MW. 

A large number of people came from different regions of Azerbaijan due to the installation of Mingachevir hydroelectric power station. In total 20,000 people took part in the construction of the power station. Approximately 10,000 German prisoners of the military were involved in the installation towards the end of the 1940s.

Technical parameters 
The capacity of the Mingachevir HPP is 359 MW which has 6 hydroaggregates. Average annual electric power production is 1.4 billion kWh. 

Water intersection includes concrete dam consisting of 3 holes (width of 30 m with an open channel), water intake facility to pressured water pipes consisting of 6 holes (length of 66 m), dam of land (Length 1550 m, height 80 m), device with 1 hole that intakes water to Upper Garabagh and Upper Shirvan canal.

See also
 List of power stations in Azerbaijan
 Mingachevir reservoir

References

External links

Dams completed in 1953
Mingachevir
Earth-filled dams
Dams in Azerbaijan
Hydroelectric power stations built in the Soviet Union
1954 establishments in the Soviet Union
1954 establishments in Azerbaijan